Arapata Tamati Hakiwai is a New Zealand Māori museum curator. Of Ngāti Kahungunu, Rongowhakaata, Ngāti Porou and Ngāi Tahu descent, he is a principal investigator with Ngā Pae o te Māramatanga. In 2014 Hakiwai completed a PhD at Victoria University of Wellington with a thesis on the politics of Māori tribal identity.

He is the current Kaihautū (or Māori leader) of the Museum of New Zealand Te Papa Tongarewa, and was the acting Chief Executive before the appointment of Rick Ellis.

Career
Hakiwai has been a teacher at Wellington High School before starting work in the museum sector in 1989.

References

External links
 Linked-in
 Profile on the Te Papa website

Living people
New Zealand curators
Ngāti Kahungunu people
Rongowhakaata people
Ngāti Porou people
Ngāi Tahu people
People associated with the Museum of New Zealand Te Papa Tongarewa
Year of birth missing (living people)
Place of birth missing (living people)
Victoria University of Wellington alumni
Māori studies academics
Halbert-Kohere family